Sulfotransferase 1C2 is an enzyme that in humans is encoded by the SULT1C2 gene.

Function 

Sulfotransferase enzymes catalyze the sulfate conjugation of many hormones, neurotransmitters, drugs, and xenobiotic compounds. These cytosolic enzymes are different in their tissue distributions and substrate specificities. The gene structure (number and length of exons) is similar among family members. This gene encodes a protein that belongs to the SULT1 subfamily, responsible for transferring a sulfo moiety from PAPS to phenol-containing compounds. Two alternatively spliced transcript variants encoding different isoforms have been described for this gene.

References

Further reading